The 2016 Cork Junior A Football Championship was the 118th staging of the Cork Junior A Football Championship since its establishment by the Cork County Board. The draw for the opening round fixtures took place on 13 December 2015.

The final was played on 23 October 2016 at Páirc Uí Rinn in Cork, between Gabriel Rangers and Shamrocks, in what was their first ever meeting in the final. Gabriel Rangers won the match by 2–13 to 2–07 to claim their first ever championship.

Results

Final

References

2018 in Irish sport
Cork Junior Football Championship